Prairie Township is one of twenty current townships in Boone County, Arkansas, USA. As of the 2010 census, its total population was 444.

Geography

Cities, towns, and villages
Everton

Population history

Figures below include the population of the incorporated town of Everton.

References
 United States Census Bureau 2008 TIGER/Line Shapefiles
 United States Board on Geographic Names (GNIS)
 United States National Atlas

 Census 2010 U.S. Gazetteer Files: County Subdivisions in Arkansas

External links
 US-Counties.com
 City-Data.com

Townships in Boone County, Arkansas
Townships in Arkansas